The FIBT World Championships 2003 took place in Lake Placid, New York, United States (Men's bobsleigh), Winterberg, Germany (Women's bobsleigh), and Nagano, Japan (Men's and women's Skeleton). Lake Placid hosted the championship event for the eighth time, doing so previously in 1949, 1961, 1969, 1973, 1978, 1983, and 1997 (Skeleton). Winterberg hosted the championship event for a third time, doing so previously in 1995 (Bobsleigh) and 2000 (Women's bobsleigh). This was Nagano's first time hosting a championship event. It was also the first time the championships were held in Asia.

Bobsleigh

Two man

Four man

Two woman

Skeleton

Men

Women

Medal table

References
2-Man bobsleigh World Champions
2-Woman bobsleigh World Champions
4-Man bobsleigh World Champions
Men's skeleton World Champions
Women's skeleton World Champions

2003 in bobsleigh
IBSF World Championships
2003 in skeleton
International sports competitions hosted by Germany
International sports competitions hosted by Japan
Sports competitions in Nagano (city)
International sports competitions hosted by the United States
Sports in Lake Placid, New York
2003 in German sport
Bobsleigh in Germany
2003 in American sports
Bobsleigh in the United States
Bobsleigh in Japan
2003 in Japanese sport
Skeleton in Japan